Aglaomorpha willdenowii is a species of subtropical fern native to the islands of Comoros, Madagascar, and Mauritius. Drynarioid ferns are largely native to Asia and Oceania, but A. willdenowii is the only species of fern in the genus native to Madagascar. Like other Aglaomorpha, its caudex is covered in dry, scale-like sterile fronds and fine hairs, while the larger green fronds are the fertile ones bearing spores.

References

External links
 

wildenowii
Plants described in 1825
Flora of Madagascar